Michaelmas (also known as the Feast of Saints Michael, Gabriel, and Raphael, the Feast of the Archangels, or the Feast of Saint Michael and All Angels) is a Christian festival observed in some Western liturgical calendars on 29 September, and on 8 November in the Eastern tradition.  Michaelmas has been one of the four quarter days of the English and Irish financial, judicial, and academic year.

In Christian angelology, the Archangel Michael is the greatest of all the angels; he is particularly honored for defeating Lucifer in the war in heaven.

History

In the fifth century, a basilica near Rome was dedicated in honour of Saint Michael the Archangel on 30 September, beginning with celebrations on the eve of that day. 29 September is now kept in honour of Saint Michael and all Angels throughout some western churches. The name Michaelmas comes from a shortening of "Michael's Mass", in the same style as Christmas (Christ's Mass) and Candlemas (Candle Mass, the Mass where traditionally the candles to be used throughout the year would be blessed).

During the Middle Ages, Michaelmas was celebrated as a Holy Day of Obligation, but this tradition was abolished in the 18th century. In medieval England, Michaelmas marked the ending and beginning of the husbandman's year, George C. Homans observes: "at that time harvest was over, and the bailiff or reeve of the manor would be making out the accounts for the year."

Because it falls near the equinox, this holy day is associated in the northern hemisphere with the beginning of autumn and the shortening of days. It was also one of the English, Welsh, and Irish quarter days, when accounts had to be settled. On manors, it was the day when a reeve was elected from the peasants. Michaelmas hiring fairs were held at the end of September or beginning of October. The day was also considered a "gale day" in Ireland when rent would be due, as well as a day for the issuing or settling of contracts or other legal transactions.

Celebration
On the Isle of Skye, Scotland, a procession was held. One of the few flowers left around at this time of year is the Michaelmas daisy (also known as asters). Hence the rhyme: "The Michaelmas daisies, among dead weeds, Bloom for St Michael's valorous deeds ..."

In Ireland,, pilgrimages to holy wells associated with St Michael took place, with pilgrims taking a drink from the holy water from the well. The greeting "May Michaelmas féinín on you" was traditional. Boys born on this day were often christened Michael or Micheál. In Tramore, County Waterford, a procession with an effigy of St Michael, called the Micilín, was brought through the town to the shore to mark the end of the fishing season. In Irish folklore, clear weather on Michaelmas was a portent of a long winter, "Michaelmas Day be bright and clear there will be two 'Winters' in the year."

Food
A traditional meal for the day includes goose known as a stubble-goose (one prepared around harvest time) also known as an embling or rucklety goose.

The association of geese with Michaelmas comes from a legend in which the son of an Irish king choked on a goose bone he'd eaten, and was consequently brought back to life by St. Patrick. The king ordered the sacrifice of a goose every Michaelmas in honour of the saint. The Irish Michaelmas goose was slaughtered and eaten on the day; they were also presented as gifts or donated to the poor.
In parts of Ireland sheep were also slaughtered with tradition of the "St. Michael's portion" donated to the poor. Poultry markets and fairs took place to sell geese as well as mutton pies. In Ulster, it was traditional for tenants to present their landlord with a couple of geese, a tradition dating back to Edward IV. There were differing methods across Ireland for cooking the goose, most generally using a heavy iron pot on an open hearth. In Blacklion, County Cavan, the goose was covered in local blue clay and placed at the centre of the fire until the clay broke, indicating the goose was cooked.

The custom of baking a special bread or cake, called , St. Michael's bannock, or Michaelmas bannock, on the eve of the Feast of Saint Michael, the Archangel, probably originated in the Hebrides. The bread was made from equal parts of barley, oats, and rye without using any metal implements.
In remembrance of absent friends or those who had died, special Struans, blessed at an early morning Mass, were given to the poor in their names.

Nuts were traditionally cracked on Michaelmas Eve.

Folklore in the British Isles suggests that Michaelmas day is the last day that blackberries can be picked. It is said that when St. Michael expelled the devil, Lucifer, from heaven, he fell from the skies and landed in a prickly blackberry bush. Satan cursed the fruit, scorched them with his fiery breath, stamped, spat, and urinated on them, so that they would be unfit for eating. As it is considered ill-advised to eat them after 11 October (Old Michaelmas Day according to the Julian Calendar), a Michaelmas pie is made from the last of the season. In Ireland, the soiling of blackberries is also attributed to a púca.

Differences in number of archangels

In the Roman Catholic Church on 29 September three Archangels are celebrated: Saint Michael, Saint Gabriel, and Saint Raphael. Their feasts were unified in one common day during the second half of the 20th century. In the time before their feasts were: 29 September (only St Michael), 24 March for St Gabriel, and, lastly, 24 October for St Raphael. 

In some denominations a reference to a fourth angel, usually Uriel, is also added.
In Anglican and Episcopal tradition, there are three or four archangels in its calendar for 29 September feast for St. Michael and All Angels: namely Michael, Gabriel and Raphael, and often, Uriel.

Autumn term in universities

Michaelmas is used in the extended sense of autumn, as the name of the first term of the academic year, which begins at this time, at various educational institutions in the United Kingdom, Ireland and those parts of the Commonwealth in the northern hemisphere. These include the universities of Cambridge, Durham, Lancaster, the London School of Economics, Oxford, Swansea, and Dublin.  However, the ancient Scottish universities used the name Martinmas for their autumn term, following the old Scottish term days.

Use by legal profession
The Inns of Court of the English Bar and the Honorable Society of King's Inns in Ireland also have a Michaelmas term as one of their dining terms. It begins in September and ends towards the end of December.

The term is also the name of the first of four terms into which the legal year is divided by the courts of Ireland and England and Wales.

In the United Kingdom, the United States and Ireland, a Red Mass is traditionally convened on the Sunday closest to Michaelmas, in honor of and to bless lawyers and judges.

While terms are not used by most courts in the United States, where court calendars are usually continuous and year-round, the U.S. Supreme Court operates on an annual term and roughly follows the English custom by beginning that term on the first Monday in October, a few days after Michaelmas.

Modern observances

Because Saint Michael is the patron of police officers, Michaelmas may also see a Blue Mass. Lutheran Christians consider it a principal feast of Christ, and the Lutheran Confessor, Philip Melanchthon, wrote a hymn for the day that is still sung in Lutheran churches: "Lord God, We All to Thee Give Praise" (The Lutheran Hymnal 254), which shares its tune with the Old 100th hymn.

Michaelmas is still celebrated in Waldorf schools. Rudolf Steiner considered it the second most important festival after Easter. The celebration  of this holiday teaches the importance of facing fears and strengthening resolve. As the first festival of the new school year, it is celebrated with an all-school play, in which each class assumes a role, such as peasants, townspeople, nobles, etc. Students assume a new role as they pass from grade to grade, and it becomes something of a rite of passage.

In the City of London, Michaelmas is the day when the new Lord Mayor of London is elected, in the Common Hall.

In Mifflin County, Pennsylvania, Michaelmas has been observed since 1786 as Goose Day. Local tradition holds that eating goose on 29 September will bring prosperity. The good-luck goose connection comes from Queen Elizabeth I, who was said to be eating goose on Michaelmas in 1588 when she received news that her royal navy defeated the Spanish Armada. The Juniata River Valley began celebrating this version of Michaelmas when a Pennsylvania Dutchman named Andrew Pontius moved his family to neighboring Snyder County to farm. When his farm prospered, he decided to hire a tenant farmer to help. On his way to Lancaster to hire a German immigrant, he stopped in Harrisburg for the night where he met a young Englishman named Archibald Hunter, who was offered the job. The contract that was drawn for employment contained a clause specifying their accounts were to be settled each year on the traditional day to do so, 29 September. When that day came, Hunter appeared at Pontius' door with his accounts and a goose, explaining that in England, eating a goose on 29 September brought good luck. The tradition spread to nearby Lewistown, Pennsylvania, where it is still honored today with many local restaurants and civics groups offering goose dinners, local festivals, and other county-wide activities. In honor of the holiday, painted fiberglass goose statues can be found throughout the county all year long.

Old Michaelmas Day
Old Michaelmas Day falls on 11 October (10 October according to some sources – the dates are the result of the shift from the Julian to the Gregorian calendar so the gap widens by a day every century except the current one). It is said that the Devil fell out of Heaven on this date, and fell into a blackberry bush, cursing the fruit as he fell. According to an old legend, blackberries should not be picked after this date (see above). In Yorkshire, it is said that the devil spat on them. According to Morrell (1977), this old legend is well known in all parts of Great Britain, even as far north as the Orkney Islands. In Cornwall, a similar legend prevails; however, the saying goes that the devil urinated on them.

See also
St Michael and All Angels Church
Michaelmas Daisy
Mehregan

References

Further reading
 Morrell, P. (1977). Festivals and Customs. London: Pan (Piccolo).

External links

Alice's Medieval Feasts & Fasts: Michaelmas
Catholic Encyclopedia: St. Gabriel the Archangel
Catholic Encyclopedia: St. Raphael the Archangel
Prayers Dedicated to St. Michael the Archangel
Michael and All Angels

Michael
Public holidays in the United Kingdom
September observances
Michael (archangel)
Quarter days

de:Michael (Erzengel)#Festtag